The 1988 Vuelta a España was the 43rd edition of the Vuelta a España, one of cycling's Grand Tours. The Vuelta began in Santa Cruz de Tenerife, with an individual time trial on 25 April, and Stage 11 occurred on 5 May with a stage to Valdezcaray. The race finished in Madrid on 15 May.

Stage 1
25 April 1988 — Santa Cruz de Tenerife to Santa Cruz de Tenerife,  (ITT)

Stage 2
26 April 1988 — San Cristóbal de La Laguna to Santa Cruz de Tenerife,

Stage 3
27 April 1988 — Las Palmas to Las Palmas,  (TTT)

Stage 4
28 April 1988 — Alcalá del Río to Badajoz,

Stage 5
29 April 1988 — Badajoz to Béjar,

Stage 6
30 April 1988 — Béjar to Valladolid,

Stage 7
1 May 1988 — Valladolid to León,

Stage 8

Stage 9
3 May 1988 — Oviedo to Monte Naranco,  (ITT)

Stage 10
4 May 1988 — Oviedo to Santander,

Stage 11
5 May 1988 — Santander to Valdezcaray,

References

01
1988,01